Bodianus flavipinnis, the yellowfin pigfish, is a species of wrasse. 
It is found in the Southwest Pacific Ocean.

Size

References

flavipinnis
Fish of the Pacific Ocean
Taxa named by Martin F. Gomon
Fish described in 2001